The Children's Theatre "Na Neve" (en ) is a theatre in Saint Petersburg. The theatre was opened in 1987.

References

Theatres in Saint Petersburg